The Western Union Building, formerly known as the Hagerty Block and currently as the Dacotah Prairie Museum, is a historic bank building in Aberdeen, South Dakota. It is individually listed on the National Register of Historic Places and is a contributing property to the Aberdeen Commercial Historic District.

History

The Northwestern National Bank formed in Aberdeen in 1888 with Henry Marple as president. In August 1888, the bank purchased the property and general store at 21–23 South Main Street to build a new bank building. Construction took place from 1888 through 1889 with the bank opening in the new location in February 1889. In May 1891, a fire damaged the building and gutted the Kearney and Boyer grocery store. In March 1903, another fire damaged the building, originating in the basement banana room of the Gamble & Robinson grocery store.

The building was purchased by Jay Hagerty in 1907, becoming known as the Hagerty Block. In 1920, existing tenant Western Union took over the most prominent space in the building, which then became known as the Western Union Building. Over the years, aside from the bank, the building housed grocery stores and several offices. In 1970, the building was donated to Brown County for a museum, which opened as the Dacotah Prairie Museum that October. By 1980 the museum was the sole occupant of the building.

The building was nominated for the National Register of Historic Places as the only remaining 19th century bank building in Aberdeen; it was listed on December 12, 1976. The building is also listed on the National Register as a key contributing property of the Aberdeen Commercial Historic District; the district was listed on May 23, 1988.

Architecture
The Western Union Building is an example of Romanesque Revival architecture. The structure is a three-story building made of red brick laid in running bond. There are three main entrances, each framed by a large arch and set a few steps above street level. Pilasters extend the full height of the building, separating windows on the first floor and window pairs on the second and third floors. The interior has undergone renovations, but the exterior has changed little over the building's history.

See also
National Register of Historic Places listings in Brown County, South Dakota
List of museums in South Dakota
List of natural history museums in the United States

Notes

References

Bibliography

External links

Dacotah Prairie Museum website

Buildings and structures in Brown County, South Dakota
Commercial buildings completed in 1899
National Register of Historic Places in Brown County, South Dakota
Historic district contributing properties in South Dakota
Romanesque Revival architecture in South Dakota
Museums in Brown County, South Dakota
History museums in South Dakota
Western Union buildings and structures